A list of U.S. films released in 1982.

Gandhi received the Academy Award for Best Picture of 1982.
The highest-grossing American film released in 1982 was E.T. The Extra-Terrestrial.



A-B

C-G

H-M

N-S

T-Z

See also
 1982 in American television
 1982 in the United States

External links

 
 List of 1982 box office number-one films in the United States

1982
Films
Lists of 1982 films by country or language